N-Methylpiperazine is a heterocyclic organic compound.

Uses
N-Methylpiperazine is a common building block used in organic synthesis.  For example, N-methylpiperazine is used in the manufacture of various pharmaceutical drugs including cyclizine, meclizine, and sildenafil.

The lithium salt, lithium N-methylpiperazide, is used as a reagent in organic synthesis for protection of aryl aldehydes.

Synthesis
Industrially, N-methylpiperazine is produced by reacting diethanolamine and methylamine at 250 bar and 200 °C.

References

Piperazines